The 1260s BC is a decade which lasted from 1269 BC to 1260 BC.

Events and trends

 c. 1263 BC—Ramses II, king of ancient Egypt, and Hattusilis III, king of the Hittites, sign the earliest known peace treaty.
 1263 BC—The approximate date traditionally offered for the biblical Exodus of the Israelites from Egypt under the leadership of Moses.

Significant people

References